Hemne is a former municipality in Trøndelag county, Norway. The municipality existed from 1838 until its dissolution in 2020 when it was incorporated into Heim Municipality. It was part of the Fosen region.  The administrative centre of the municipality was the village of Kyrksæterøra. Other villages included Heim, Hellandsjøen, Holla, and Vinjeøra.  The European route E39 highway runs through the southern part of Hemne.

At the time of its dissolution in 2020, the  municipality is the 169th largest by area out of the 422 municipalities in Norway. Hemne is the 225th most populous municipality in Norway with a population of 4,225.

General information
Hemne was established as a municipality on 1 January 1838 (see formannskapsdistrikt law). On 1 January 1911, the northern district of Heim (population: 1,533) was separated from Hemne to form a municipality of its own.  This left Hemne with 3,425 residents.  On 1 July 1924, Hemne was further divided with the eastern district of Snillfjord (population: 776) and the southern district of Vinje (population: 716) were separated from Hemne to form separate municipalities. After the division, Hemne had 2,030 residents remaining.

During the 1960s, there were many municipal mergers across Norway due to the work of the Schei Committee. On 1 January 1964, the neighboring municipalities of Vinje (population: 576) and the parts of Heim west of the Hemnfjorden (population: 711), were merged into Hemne.  On 1 January 2008, the Fossdalen farm (population: 4) was transferred from the neighboring municipality of Rindal (in Møre og Romsdal county) to Hemne (in Sør-Trøndelag county).

On 1 January 2018, the municipality of Hemne switched from the old Sør-Trøndelag county to the new Trøndelag county.

On 1 January 2020, the municipality of Hemne merged with the Ytre Snillfjord area in the neighboring municipality of Snillfjord and the neighboring municipality of Halsa to form the new municipality of Heim (resurrecting an old name for the area).

Name
The municipality (originally the parish) is named after the Hemnfjorden since flowed through the area. The name is derived from the word  which means "port" or "haven" (referring to the good port of Hemnskjel). Before 1918, the name was written Hevne.

Coat of arms
The coat of arms was granted on 14 June 1991 and it was in use until 1 January 2020 when the municipality was dissolved. The official blazon is "Gules, five hazelnuts in annulo stems to center conjoined Or". This means the arms have a red field (background) and the charge is five hazelnuts in a circular arrangement with their stems connected in the centre. The hazelnet design has a tincture of Or which means it is commonly colored yellow, but if it is made out of metal, then gold is used. The design symbolizes the relatively large hazel forests in the municipality, which was historically important to the local economy. The arms were designed by Einar H. Skjervold.

Churches
The Church of Norway had three parishes within the municipality of Hemne.  It is part of the Orkdal prosti (Deanery) within the Diocese of Nidaros.

Government
While it existed, this municipality was responsible for primary education (through 10th grade), outpatient health services, senior citizen services, unemployment and other social services, zoning, economic development, and municipal roads. During its existence, this municipality was governed by a municipal council of elected representatives, which in turn elected a mayor. The municipality fell under the Trøndelag District Court and the Frostating Court of Appeal.

Municipal council
The municipal council of Hemne is made up of 23 representatives that are elected to four year terms. The party breakdown of the final municipal council was as follows:

Mayors
The mayors of Hemne:

1838-1838: Johan Sophus Lossius	
1838–1839: Lars Pedersen Strand  	
1840–1843: Christian Sophonias Kiøbing Borch  	
1844–1855: Lars Arntsen Lian  	
1856–1863: Lars Pedersen Moe  	
1864–1871: Mogens Marcus Wessel  	
1872–1877: Kristoffer Johnsen Øye  	
1878–1881: John Larsen Moe (H)
1882–1885: Lars Ingebrigtsen Sinnes 	
1886–1889: John Johnsen Vaagan (V)
1890-1890: Georg Severin Schjelderup (H)
1890–1901: John Larsen Moe (H)
1902–1907: Peder Larsen Moe (H)
1908–1922: Lars Johnsen Moe (V)
1923–1924: Haakon Myrholt (V)
1924–1934: Ingvald Tøndel (Bp)
1935–1945: Steinar Alstad (Bp/NS)
1946–1947: Håkon Fagervoll (Ap)
1948–1955: John Johnsen Moe (Bp) 
1956–1959: Ole Kjønsvik (Ap)
1960–1963: Severin Witsø (Sp)
1964–1975: Ole Kjønsvik (Ap)
1976–1987: Gunnar Bjørkøy (Sp)
1988–2003: Johan Stølan (Ap)
2003–2007: Gunnar Hynne (Sp)
2007–2015: Ståle Vaag (Ap)
2015–2019: Odd Jarle Svanem (Sp)

Geography

Hemne was bordered on the east by the municipalities of Snillfjord and Orkdal, on the south by Rindal (in Trøndelag county) and Surnadal (in Møre og Romsdal county), and in the west by Aure and Halsa (both in Møre og Romsdal county). To the north, across the waters of the Trondheimsleia lies the municipality of Hitra.

The Hemnfjorden forms the border between Hemne and Snillfjord.  The Vinjefjorden is located in the southwestern side of the municipality and the lake Vasslivatnet lies in the southeast.  In the south near Vinjeøra, there are several hiking trails to mountain lodges such as Sollia.

The Grønkjølen Nature Reserve lies in the extreme south of the municipality.

See also
List of former municipalities of Norway

References

External links
 

 
Heim, Norway
Former municipalities of Norway
1838 establishments in Norway
2020 disestablishments in Norway
Populated places disestablished in 2020